Painted tree iguana is a common name for two species of iguana:

 Liolaemus pictus
 Liolaemus septentrionalis

Animal common name disambiguation pages